The 389th Rifle Division was an infantry division of the Soviet Union during World War II.

The division was formed in October 1941 part of the 53rd Army of the Central Asian Military District, and was deployed for active field duty from May 1942 through to May 1945.

The 389th Rifle Division particularly distinguished itself in early January 1944 during the liberation of Berdychiv from the German military, for which it was awarded the honorary title of "Berdychevskaya".

For its actions in the Berlin Offensive, the 389th was awarded the Order of Bogdan Khmelnitsky, 2nd class, on 4 June 1945.

In a Stavka directive dated 29 May 1945, the 389th Rifle Division was listed among those to be disbanded in place.

References

Citations

Bibliography

Further reading
Robert G. Poirier and Albert Z. Conner, The Red Army Order of Battle in the Great Patriotic War, Novato: Presidio Press, 1985. . Poirer and Conner primarily used the wartime files of the German Foreign Armies East ('FHO') intelligence section, of which substantial sections are now held by the U.S. National Archives.

389
Military units and formations awarded the Order of the Red Banner
Military units and formations established in 1941
Military units and formations disestablished in 1945